Tom Egberink and Michaël Jérémiasz defeated the defending champion Ronald Vink and his partner Robin Ammerlaan in the final, 6–4, 6–2 to win the gentlemen's doubles wheelchair tennis title at the 2012 Wimbledon Championships.

Maikel Scheffers and Vink were the reigning champions, but Scheffers did not participate.

Seeds

  Robin Ammerlaan /  Ronald Vink (final)
  Stéphane Houdet /  Nicolas Peifer (semifinals, third place)

Draw

Finals

References
Draw

Men's Wheelchair Doubles
Wimbledon Championship by year – Wheelchair men's doubles